Maury City is a town in Crockett County, Tennessee. The population was 674 at the 2010 census.  Locals pronounce the town's name as "Murray City."

History

Maury City is named for congressman and state legislator Abram Poindexter Maury (1801–1848).  The city incorporated in 1911.

Charles P. Roland, historian of the Civil War and the American South, was born in Maury City in 1918. His father, Clifford Paul Roland, was a schoolteacher in Maury City.

Geography
Maury City is located at  (35.815535, -89.223866).  The town is situated at the intersection of State Route 88 and State Route 189, northwest of Jackson and southeast of Dyersburg.  SR 88 connects the city with U.S. Route 412 and Alamo to the east, and with the Halls area to the west. SR 189 connects Maury City with Friendship to the north.

Demographics

As of the census of 2000, there were 704 people, 301 households, and 195 families residing in the town. The population density was 632.0 people per square mile (244.9/km2). There were 325 housing units at an average density of 291.8 per square mile (113.0/km2). The racial makeup of the town was 62.64% White, 32.81% African American, 0.14% Asian, 2.98% from other races, and 1.42% from two or more races. Hispanic or Latino of any race were 4.12% of the population.

There were 301 households, out of which 27.6% had children under the age of 18 living with them, 48.5% were married couples living together, 13.6% had a female householder with no husband present, and 34.9% were non-families. 31.9% of all households were made up of individuals, and 14.6% had someone living alone who was 65 years of age or older. The average household size was 2.34 and the average family size was 2.92.

In the town, the population was spread out, with 22.6% under the age of 18, 8.9% from 18 to 24, 26.8% from 25 to 44, 25.0% from 45 to 64, and 16.6% who were 65 years of age or older. The median age was 39 years. For every 100 females, there were 89.2 males. For every 100 females age 18 and over, there were 86.0 males.

The median income for a household in the town was $26,645, and the median income for a family was $33,250. Males had a median income of $23,250 versus $24,375 for females. The per capita income for the town was $14,519. About 13.7% of families and 16.1% of the population were below the poverty line, including 17.8% of those under age 18 and 16.4% of those age 65 or over.

References

External links

Towns in Tennessee
Towns in Crockett County, Tennessee